Marriner is both a surname and a given name. Notable people with the name include:

Surname:
Ricky Marriner (born 1984),
Soldier British Army
Andre Marriner (born 1971), English professional football referee who officiates in the Premier League
Andrew Marriner (born 1954), British classical clarinettist
Chelsea Marriner, dog handler and trainer from New Zealand
Craig Marriner (born 1974), New Zealand novelist 
Sir Neville Marriner (1924–2016), English conductor and violinist
Steve Marriner, Canadian multi-instrumentalist

Given name:
Marriner Stoddard Eccles (1890–1977), U.S. banker, economist and member and chairman of the Federal Reserve
Marriner W. Merrill (1832–1906), Canadian-born member of the Quorum of the Twelve Apostles of The Church of Jesus Christ of Latter-day Saints
Edmund Marriner Gill (1820–1894),  English landscape painter who favoured waterfalls

See also
Mount Marriner, a mountain in the Antarctic
Mariner (disambiguation)